Alexander Lind (born 23 March 1989) is a Norwegian football striker who plays for FK Donn.

He spent time in Eliteserien with IK Start in 2014, playing almost half the games. He thereafter played four seasons in the 1. divisjon with FK Jerv.

References

1989 births
Living people
Sportspeople from Kristiansand
Norwegian footballers
IK Start players
FK Jerv players
Eliteserien players
Norwegian First Division players
Association football forwards